The A493 is a road located on the west coast of mid Wales and connects Dolgellau to Machynlleth via the coast, avoiding Corris and Cross Foxes.

Route
The road passes through Pennal, Aberdyfi, Tywyn, Bryncrug, Llanfendigaid, Rhoslefain, Llangelynin, Llwyngwril, Friog, Fairbourne, Arthog and Penmaenpool. The road is approximately 32 miles long. Because of the location of the road which is next to the coast for the majority of the journey, road surveying is essential to prevent landslips into the sea. Retaining walls are often used and stone walls are used instead of safety rails to help conservation efforts in Snowdonia National Park.

Transport for Wales Rail  runs trains from Machynlleth to Barmouth which run adjacent to the road for much of the route; the trains join and leave the road at Barmouth Bridge and Dovey Junction.

Popular culture
A Vauxhall advertisement was filmed at Penmaenpool toll bridge and the scenes were shot from the A493 road.

Roads in Wales